Ali Hassani Sefat is an Iranian professional football player currently playing for Malavan in the Iran Pro League.

Career
Hassani Sefat joined Malavan F.C. in 2010 after spending the previous season at Petrochimi Tabriz F.C. in the Azadegan League.

References

External sources
 Profile at Persianleague
 

Living people
Iranian footballers
Petrochimi Tabriz F.C. players
Persian Gulf Pro League players
Azadegan League players
Malavan players
Association football goalkeepers
Year of birth missing (living people)
People from Bandar-e Anzali
Sportspeople from Gilan province